Ágnes Valkai (born 27 February 1981) is a Hungarian female water polo player. She was a member of the Hungary women's national water polo team, playing as a driver. She was a part of the Hungary team that claimed the gold medal at the 2005 FINA World Championship in Montreal, Quebec, Canada. She was also a part of the team at the 2004 Summer Olympics and 2008 Summer Olympics. On club level she played for Olympiacos in Greece and for Roma in Italy.

She is the younger sister of water polo player Erzsébet Valkai.

See also
 Hungary women's Olympic water polo team records and statistics
 List of world champions in women's water polo
 List of World Aquatics Championships medalists in water polo

References

External links
 

1981 births
Living people
Hungarian female water polo players
Olympiacos Women's Water Polo Team players
Water polo players at the 2004 Summer Olympics
Water polo players at the 2008 Summer Olympics
Olympic water polo players of Hungary
20th-century Hungarian women
21st-century Hungarian women